Kizhakku Cheemayile is a 1993 Indian Tamil-language drama film directed by Bharathiraja. It stars Vijayakumar, Raadhika and Napoleon, while Vignesh, Pandiyan, and Vadivelu play supporting roles. The film involves a touching sentimental story between a brother and a sister. The music was scored by A. R. Rahman marking Rahman's first collaboration with Bharathiraja.

Kizhakku Cheemayile was released on 13 November 1993, during Diwali, and became a commercial success. The film was remade in Telugu as Palnati Pourusham (1994) and unofficially in Kannada as Gowdru (2004).

Plot 
Maayaandi Thevan is very fond of his younger sister Virumaayi. She too pours love and affection onto Maayaandi. Virumaayi is married to Sivanaandi from the neighbouring village. Sivanaandi's brother-in-law Periya Karuppu does not like Maayaandi and tries to create a rift between them. During a village festival, he creates a problem between Maayaandi and Sivanaandi, causing the family to split. Periya Karuppu's wife realizes this and commits suicide. Thinking that Maayaandi is the reason for this, Sivanaandi breaks all ties with him and forbids Virumaayi from seeing her brother. Periya Karuppu also dies soon after that.

Years rolls by and Maayaandi's son Seenu comes back to the village after studying in the city. He sees his cousin, Virumaayi's daughter Pechchi and they both rekindle their love. Sivanaandi finds out and tries to separate the couple. He arranges Pechchi's wedding with his nephew Chinna Karuppu, who is a spoiled brat and womanizer. Pechchi, with the help of her mother, escapes home and meets Seenu.

A fight ensues between the two villages, with Maayaandi and Sivanaandi accusing each other for what Pechchi and Seenu did. Chinna Karuppu fights with Seenu, and in the end Seenu wins. Chinna Karuppu says that he is not an enemy to their love but hates his uncle Sivanaandi as he did not help his father Periya Karuppu, leading to his death. At the fighting ground, Virumaayi asks Maayaandi to spare her husband's life, but Sivanaandi tries to kill Maayaandi. Virumaayi comes in between and gets wounded in the neck by Sivanaandi, much to everyone's shock. She removes the nuptial string from her neck, declaring that she does not have any more relationship with Sivanaandi. She dies in her brother Maayaandi's arms. Maayaandi carries Virumaayi while a devastated Sivanaandi looks from afar.

Cast

Production 
Screenwriter M. Rathnakumar first approached Kalaipuli S. Thanu to produce this film. Thanu liked the script, worked on it with him, and then asked him to narrate it to Bharathiraja, saying he is the appropriate person to direct the film. The project became a reality after he came on board. The film was made on first copy basis by Bharathiraja for the producer at a cost of 80 lakhs. Originally, Rajkiran was considered for the lead role. However, when his salary expectation was too high, Vijayakumar was finally selected for the role. Vadivelu was paid a small amount for the film. However, after acting in the film in the character of Occhu, he stated that this film's success would establish his career, which it did. Thanu advertised the film using only Bharathiraja, A. R. Rahman, and Vairamuthu in the wall posters on the launch date as they were more popular than the artistes. For the first time, computerised digital designing method was used to print posters and publicity materials. Raadhika was initially reluctant to accept playing the female lead since she had just given birth, but when Bharathiraja persuaded her, she relented. Poet Arivumathi worked as an assistant with this film.

Soundtrack 
The soundtrack was composed by A. R. Rahman and lyrics written by Vairamuthu. Kizhakku Cheemayile was the first film where Bharathiraja and Rahman worked together. The songs gained Rahman notice for composing folk music, contrary to his reputation for composing westernised music.

Release and reception 
Kizhakku Cheemayile was released on 13 November 1993, Diwali day. Malini Mannath of The Indian Express wrote, "With some sterling performances [..] and some emotion-charged scenes that move the viewer, Kizhakku Cheemayile may not be the classic Bharatiraja film, but it is a good film that makes you forget its flaws." Seetha Ravi of Kalki gave a more mixed review, saying the happiness in the stills was not present in the film.

Accolades

References

Bibliography

External links 
 

1990s Tamil-language films
1993 drama films
1993 films
Films directed by Bharathiraja
Films scored by A. R. Rahman
Indian drama films
Tamil films remade in other languages